Fyodor Andreyevich Dvornikov (born 28 December 1992) is a Russian football player.

Club career
He made his professional debut in the Russian Professional Football League for FC Biolog-Novokubansk on 12 August 2014 in a game against FC Chernomorets Novorossiysk.

He made his Russian Football National League debut for FC Khimki on 17 August 2016 in a game against FC Fakel Voronezh.

References

External links
 

1992 births
Footballers from Moscow
Living people
Russian footballers
Association football forwards
FC Khimki players
FC Rostov players
FC Dynamo Saint Petersburg players
FC Sokol Saratov players
FC SKA Rostov-on-Don players
FC Yenisey Krasnoyarsk players
FC Zenit-Izhevsk players
Russian First League players
Russian Second League players